Doubling with Danger is a 1926 American silent mystery film directed by Scott R. Dunlap and starring Richard Talmadge, Ena Gregory and Joseph W. Girard.

Plot

Cast
 Richard Talmadge as Dick Forsythe 
 Ena Gregory as Madeline Haver 
 Joseph W. Girard as Elwood Haver 
 Fred Kelsey as Avery McCade 
 Harry Dunkinson as Detective McCade 
 Douglas Gerrard as Malcolm Davis 
 Paul Dennis as Arthur Channing 
 Herbert Prior as Manning Davis 
 Joseph Harrington as Morton Stephens

References

Bibliography
 Munden, Kenneth White. The American Film Institute Catalog of Motion Pictures Produced in the United States, Part 1. University of California Press, 1997.

External links

1926 films
1926 mystery films
American mystery films
American silent feature films
Film Booking Offices of America films
Films directed by Scott R. Dunlap
American black-and-white films
1920s English-language films
1920s American films
Silent mystery films